Allessia Claes (born 1981) is a Belgian politician and a member of the New Flemish Alliance.

Claes took part in elections for the first time in the municipal elections of 2012 in her hometown of Scherpenheuvel-Zichem and become a councilor for the town. She was party leader and candidate mayor for the N-VA in the 2018 municipal elections in Scherpenheuvel-Zichem. She became party leader for the five-member N-VA faction in the city council. In those elections she also stood for the provincial council from 14th place. In the 2019 Belgian regional elections, Claes was elected as a Flemish Member of Parliament on the list of the N-VA in the Constituency of Flemish Brabant with 10,260 preference votes. She was also sent to the Senate as a state senator.

Notes

1981 births
Living people
People from Hasselt
New Flemish Alliance politicians
Members of the Flemish Parliament
Members of the Senate (Belgium)
21st-century Belgian politicians